Karl Johnson (13 September 1883 – 6 November 1952) was a Swedish wrestler. He competed in the lightweight event at the 1912 Summer Olympics.

References

External links
 

1883 births
1952 deaths
Olympic wrestlers of Sweden
Wrestlers at the 1912 Summer Olympics
Swedish male sport wrestlers
Sportspeople from Västra Götaland County